Polinices hepaticus is a species of predatory sea snail, a marine gastropod mollusk in the family Naticidae, the moon snails.

Description 
The maximum recorded shell length is 51 mm.

Habitat 
The minimum recorded depth for this species is 0 m.; the maximum recorded depth is 55 m.

References

Naticidae
Gastropods described in 1798